The Concierto pastoral is a flute concerto by Joaquín Rodrigo.  Rodrigo wrote the work from 1977-1978 on commission from James Galway, who had first encountered the composer's work in 1974 when he asked permission to transcribe the Fantasia para un Gentilhombre for flute.  Galway gave its premiere on October 17, 1978, in London, with Eduardo Mata conducting the Philharmonia Orchestra.

Movements

The concerto is in three movements, the second of which is the source of the name "pastoral":

 Allegro
 Adagio
 Rondo (allegro)

The first and third movements contain many intervals of sevenths, octaves and ninths, as well as considerable use of grace notes and appoggiaturas.

References

External links
 Joaquín Rodrigo official web site, page on Concierto pastoral in Spanish

Concertos by Joaquín Rodrigo
Flute concertos
1978 compositions